Hwajeong-myeon, also called Hwajeong Township, or Hwajeong for short, is a myeon in Yeosu, a city in the South Jeolla Province, South Korea.

General 
The township of Hwajeong-myeon is located in the south and south-western part of the city of Yeosu. The township is made up only of islands. The township hall is located in Baegya-ri, and the address of the township hall is8-11, Baegya3-gil, Hwajeong-myeon. Hwayang-myeon is situated in Jangsu Bay, in the northern region of Yeosu with Yeoja Bay to the north-west, Gamak Bay and Dolsan-eup to the north-east, Nam-myeon to the east, Yeongnam-myeon and Goheung County to the west, and the South Sea to the south.

Transport 
The major road in Hwajeong is National Route 77 which includes several bridges in the township such as Baegyadaegyo and is set to include bridges scheduled to be built, such as Palyeongdaegyo.

Ri
Hwajeong-myeon is administered in ten jurisdictions and twenty administrative districts.

References

External links 
 여수시 화정면사무소

Towns and townships in South Jeolla Province
Yeosu